Patrik Posavac (born 14 March 1995) is a football player from Slovenia who plays as a midfielder.

References

External links
PrvaLiga profile 

1995 births
Living people
Slovenian footballers
Association football midfielders
FC Koper players
Slovenian PrvaLiga players